Caprona (also known as Caspak) is a fictional island in the literary universe of Edgar Rice Burroughs' Caspak Trilogy, including The Land That Time Forgot, The People That Time Forgot, and Out of Time's Abyss. They were published as serial novels in 1918, and collected in book form in 1924.

The island
In the first novel, Caprona is described as a land mass near Antarctica and was first reported by the (fictitious) Italian explorer Caproni in 1721, the location of which was subsequently lost. The island is ringed by high cliffs, making it inaccessible to all but the most intrepid explorers. (The people who first explore the island access it by taking a submarine through a tunnel.) It has a tropical river teeming with primitive creatures extinct elsewhere and a thermal inland sea, essentially a huge crater lake, whose heat sustains Caprona’s tropical climate.

Burroughs postulates a unique biological system for his lost world, in which the slow progress of evolution in the world outside is recapitulated as a matter of individual metamorphosis. This system is only hinted at in The Land That Time Forgot; presented as a mystery whose explication is gradually worked out over the course of the next two novels, it forms a thematic element serving to unite three otherwise rather loosely linked stories. Dinosaurs, prehistoric mammals, and primitive humans coexist on the island.

The island is also called "Caspak" by its native humanoid inhabitants – thus the name of the trilogy.

Caprona wildlife
Various prehistoric creatures reside on Caprona. Unlike Pellucidar, which is actually a huge melting pot of earth's various ages where all types of ancient fauna and flora intermix, the fauna and flora of Caprona is organized into different zoogeographic zones where fauna from the different respective ages are confined.

 Giant amphibians and insects such as the giant dragonfly-like Meganeura and mammal like reptile Dimetrodon are confined to the southern extremity of the island.
 Reptiles and dinosaurs dominate slightly further north.
 The lagoon in this region is infested with huge aquatic saurians such as Plesiosaurus, “a veritable Mesozoic nightmare”, according to Bowen Tyler’s journal.
 Pterodactyls fly the misty skies and dinosaurs such as the Jurassic, Diplodocus, Stegosaurus, and Allosaurus and the Cretaceous, Tyrannosaurus, Triceratops, Iguanodon, Styracosaurus, overrun the land.
 Further north, the mammals begin to dominate, beginning with the most primitive types, and upward through the late Pleistocene fauna, including Aurochs, Mastodons, Mammoths, Woolly Rhinoceroses, and Giant sloths, preyed upon by Cave bears, Smilodons, and giant panthers.
 Primates are numerous throughout the island, including "monkeys of all sizes and shades", and a variety of apes and man-like creatures. 

Among the prehistoric creatures are:

 Allosaurus
 American lion
 Antelope
 Aurochs
 Bison latifrons
 Brontosaurus
 Cattle
 Cave bear
 Cave hyena
 Cave lion
 Ceratosaurus
 Dimetrodon
 Dinilysia
 Diplodocus
 Dunkleosteus
 Gigantophis
 Goat
 Horse
 Hyaenodon
 Iguanodon
 Inostrancevia
 Jackal
 Labyrinthodont
 Mastodon
 Megalania
 Meganeura
 Megatherium
 Merychippus
 Mosasaurus
 Panther
 Plesiosaurus
 Polacanthus
 Pteranodon
 Pterodactylus
 Red deer
 Rhamphorhynchus
 Scaphognathus
 Scutosaurus
 Sheep
 Smilodon
 Snake
 Stegosaurus
 Styracosaurus
 Triceratops
 Tyrannosaurus
 Woolly mammoth
 Woolly rhinoceros

Caprona's tribes
Caprona is home to various tribes. Virtually all of them are different types of human that actually existed during the earth’s past from upright walking apes to advances species like Neanderthals and Cro-Magnons. 

The following tribes are found on Caprona:

 Ho-lu – A tribe of apes with the ability to "walk upright".
 Bo-Lu – A tribe of Neanderthals whose name means "Club Men" because they wield clubs.
 Band-Lu – A tribe of Cro-Magnons whose name means "Spear Men".
 Sto-Lu – A tribe of missing links whose name means "Hatchet Men".
 Kro-Lu - A tribe of humans whose name means "Bow Men" because they are good archers. They can domesticate cows and goats. In addition, they can domesticate wolf-like dogs to guard their livestock.
 Galu – A tribe of educated humans whose name means "Rope Men". They are experts at cloth-weaving and have been shown to domesticate horses.
 Weiroo – A tribe of winged humans. Because there are mostly male Weiroo, they often abduct female Galu for breeding purposes.

In other media

Films
Caprona is featured in several films:

 Caprona appears in the 1974 and 1977 Amicus Productions' adaptations of The Land That Time Forgot and The People That Time Forgot
 Caprona is featured in the 2009 Asylum adaptation of The Land That Time Forgot. This version is depicted as existing within the Bermuda Triangle.

Literature
 Caprona is referenced in Alan Moore's almanac called World of The League of Extraordinary Gentlemen

 Caprona is referenced in Alberto Manguel and Gianni Guadalupi's 1980 tome The Dictionary of Imaginary Places.

See also
 Pellucidar
 Savage Land

References

External links
 Maps of Caspak/Caprona
 

Fictional elements introduced in 1918
Fictional islands
Caspak trilogy
Edgar Rice Burroughs locations